Kanglei mythology is the body of narrative myths, originally told by the people of Kangleipak or Manipur, India. It may refer to:
 Meitei mythology, the mythology of the Meitei people, one of the ethnic groups of Kangleipak
 Mythologies of any other indigenous communities of Kangleipak, such as Naga mythology and Kuki mythology

See also
Kangleipak (disambiguation)